Essar Hypermart is a steel retail chain headquartered at Mumbai, India. It has a steel retailing network of 520 outlets. Essar Hypermart is a part of the multinational conglomerate, the Essar Group.

History
The company was an initiative of Essar Steel, a 14 MTPA steel producer and one of India's largest; to bring steel directly to SMEs and end-users. With its origins in India, Essar Steel sought to eliminate the role of intermediaries in the steel-buying process. The first Essar Hypermart opened in Gandhidham, Gujarat in 2006. Since then, its network has grown to include smaller franchisees and the 100th Essar Hypermart opened in Ranchi in 2010.

About Essar Hypermart
Essar Hypermart is a store for all steel products. It houses under a variety of steel products that cater to a variety of industry segments. Its product portfolio is backed by Essar Steel – a global steel producer with a presence in steel consuming markets like Asia and North America. Essar Hypermart also offers financing options like channel financing, letter of credit and bank guarantee facilities, and has introduced personalised services like the Door Delivery Model that delivers steel products directly to the consumer's doorstep. Essar Hypermart is also supported by the Essar Steel processing and distribution facilities that enable Essar Hypermart to meet the needs of customers with steel from a single to a few tonnes, customised in sizes and widths as per their requirements.

Products and services
The Essar Hypermart portfolio includes cold-rolled steel, hot-rolled steel, galvanised plain, galvanised corrugated sheets, chequered plates, shot-blasted plates, heavy plates, colour-coated steel and TMT bars.

Hot-rolled steel
Rolled to its final dimensions while hot enough to scale, Essar's hot-rolled steel is an amalgamation of the various qualities of steel. It is a useful input in various industrial applications. Hot Rolled Steel is in the form of plates, sheets and coils. Its applications are in automobiles, fabrication, general engineering, infrastructure etc. Its specific dimensions are: thickness: 1.6 mm – 20 mm, width: 1250 mm – 2000 mm, length: 2500 mm – 6300 mm.

Essar Group
Essar Hypermart is a part of the Essar Group – a multinational conglomerate in the sectors of Steel, Oil & Gas, Power, Communications, Shipping Ports & Logistics, Construction, and Mining & Minerals. With operations in more than 20 countries across five continents, the Group employs 65,000 people, with revenues of US$15 billion.

References 

Retail companies of India
Retail companies established in 2006
Companies based in Mumbai
Essar Group
Indian companies established in 2006
2006 establishments in Maharashtra